The 1999 Overseas Final was the nineteenth running of the Overseas Final. The Final was held at the Norfolk Arena in King's Lynn, England on 13 June and was open to riders from the American Final and the Australian, British, New Zealand and South African Championships.

1999 Overseas Final
13 June
 King's Lynn, Norfolk Arena
Qualification: Top 8 plus 1 reserve to the Intercontinental Final in Poole, England

References

See also
 Motorcycle Speedway

1999
World Individual